The ARCH College of Design and Business  is a design College in Jaipur (Rajasthan), India. It was set up in 2000 under the management of the Arch Educational Society.

Undergraduate (UG) Degree Courses

Bachelor of Design (B. Des) – 4 Years 
Affiliated to University of Rajasthan 

 B.Des Fashion Design
 B.Des Interior Design
 B.Des Communication Design

Bachelor of Arts (BA) – 2+1+1 Years 
Pearson BTEC HND Level 5 + BA / MA Degree awarded by UK University on Progression to 4th Year

 BA/MA Fashion Design
 BA/MA Interior Design
 BA/MA Product Design
 BA/MA Graphic Design
 BA/MA Digital Design
 BA/MA Photography

Bachelor of Vocational Studies – 3 Years 
Affiliated with Rajasthan ILD Skills University (RISU)

 B.Voc Fashion Design
 B.Voc Interior Design

Postgraduate (PG) Degree Courses

Master of Vocational Studies in Design Innovation & Entrepreneurship (M.Voc) – 2 Years  
Affiliated to Rajasthan ILD Skills University (RISU)

 M.Voc Design Innovation & Entrepreneurship (Fashion Design)
 M.Voc Design Innovation & Entrepreneurship (Interior Design)
 M.Voc Design Innovation & Entrepreneurship (Jewellery Design)
 M.Voc Design Innovation & Entrepreneurship (Product Design)
 M.Voc Design Innovation & Entrepreneurship (Design Communication)

Bachelor of Design (B. Des) – 4 Years 
Affiliated to University of Rajasthan 
 B.Des Fashion Design
 B.Des Interior Design
 B.Des Jewellery Design
 B.Des Product Design
 B.Des Communication Design

Academics 
The AIEED paper is conducted in both English & Hindi.
The Entrance Process has a GAT and CAT, containing tests of knowledge and thinking and an assessment of the psychological makeup of candidates, and is rounded off with the submission of a Video self-expression/ opinion film, along with a Portfolio of work.

International Collaborations 
ARCH has MoUs with 15 international institutions in Scotland, England, France, Ethiopia, Mexico, Ukraine, Canada.

Community Development Projects 
Students are able to work on various projects with Government bodies like the DCH (Development Commissioner Handicrafts), Ministry of Textiles, Government of India; MSME (Micro, Small and Medium Enterprises), Govt.  of India; DST (Department of Science &Technology), Government of India etc. ARCH is the official Uniform Designer & Consultant for the JAIPUR METRO RAIL CORPORATION LIMITED (JMRC).

Memberships 
ARCH has memberships in several international and national organizations like CUMULUS, International Foundation of Fashion Technology Institutes (IFFTI), World Design Organization (WDO), Fashion Design Council of India (FDCI), and Institute of Indian Interior Designers (IIID).

Linkages 
ARCH has been approved as a SKP (Skills Knowledge Provider) Institution under the NVEQF scheme of AICTE in the applied arts sector for Jewelry Design, Interior Design & Fashion Design.

Research Initiatives 
ARCH faculty & students have undertaken various research projects from development of potential academic research to investigate India's cultural heritage within the context of rural economy and sustainability. On “Innovation in Development of Indigenous Eco Crafts for High Fashion Global Market’ to Cultural Governance workshop in India with ENTAC & University of the Arts London.

In house magazine – Backstitch- a bimonthly Design magazine 

'Backstitch' is the bimonthly official Design publication of the ARCH College of Design & Business. It is an important part of our Outreach program and is intended to communicate fresh new perspectives on design, crafts, technology and other relevant news. It presents a variety of viewpoints of important practitioners & opinion makers in the Creative Industries.

Campus life 

The ARCH College of Design and Business has international representation, with students from several countries like Sweden, Spain, Kuwait, the United Kingdom, the US, Nepal, Iran, Canada, Korea, Japan, and Dubai etc. who have, at one time or the other, chosen to study at the institution.
ARCH students choose from many student activities including clubs, sports, films, plays, lectures, gallery openings, exhibitions and concerts. The different clubs run by students at the institution are Cultural Club, Dramatics Club, Movie Club, Sports Club, Literary Club, E-Club (Entrepreneurship Club) and the Alumni Club.

ARCH has its alliances with the Rotaract Club, the Red Ribbon Club, NEN (National Entrepreneurship Network), TIE (The Indus Entrepreneurs), AIESEC (an international youth organization) and YUVA Unstoppable. While the Rotaract Club and the Red Ribbon Club foster the development of Corporate Social Responsibility (CSR) needs, NEN assists in the development of entrepreneurial skills and mentoring, and AIESEC supports global networking and youth exchange programs. Students have access to a wide range of counselling and training oriented programs at ARCH, to develop their entrepreneurial skills.

References

 https://www.cumulusassociation.org/members/ARCHCollegeofDesignBusiness/

External links 
 Arch College of Design & Business Official Website

Design schools in India
Universities and colleges in Jaipur
Educational institutions established in 2000
2000 establishments in Rajasthan